is a residential neighborhood in the northern area of Meguro, Tokyo, Japan. Consisting of four districts, the neighborhood has a population of 6,847. 

The neighborhood is known as a center for education being the location of a number of selective entry high schools and the Komaba Campus of the University of Tokyo.

Geography
Komaba borders Uehara and Tomigaya in the north, Shōtō, Shinsenchō and Aobadai to the east, Ohashi and Ikejiri to the south, and Daizawa and Kitazawa to the west.

Landmarks

University of Tokyo, Komaba Campus incorporating the Graduate School of Art and Science, the Graduate School of Mathematics, the Institute of Industrial Science Research, and the Research Center for Advanced Science and Technology
Komaba Park, historic 1923 residence and garden estate of the Maeda family.
 Japan Museum of Modern Literature (on the grounds of Komaba Park)
 Komaba no Koen, featuring a municipal sports center and the Kellner Rice Fields
Japan Folk Crafts Museum
National Center for University Entrance Examinations

Transportation
Komaba is served by Komaba-Todaimae Station on the Keio Inokashira Line.

Education
 International High School
 Nippon Institute of Technology High School

Other close-by high schools that are named "Komaba", include:

 Komaba High School
Komaba Gakuen High School
 Komaba Toho Junior & Senior High School 
 Junior & Senior High School at Komaba, University of Tsukuba

Meguro City Board of Education operates public elementary and junior high schools.

All of Komaba (1-4 chōme) is zoned to Komaba Elementary School (駒場小学校) and No. 1 Junior High School (第一中学校).

References

Districts of Meguro